Alfredo Domínguez Batista (born November 15, 1961) is a Cuban dissident. Amnesty International has declared him as a prisoner of conscience.

He is a member of the Christian Liberation Movement and was involved in the Varela project. He was arrested during the Black Spring in 2003 and sentenced to 14 years in jail.

References

External links
 A site about Alfredo Domínguez Batista 
 Profile at Payolibre.com  

1961 births
Amnesty International prisoners of conscience held by Cuba
Cuban democracy activists
Cuban dissidents
Living people
Cuban prisoners and detainees